Christian Almer (29 March 1826 – 17 May 1898)  was a Swiss mountain guide and the first ascentionist of many prominent mountains in the western Alps during the golden and silver ages of alpinism. Almer was born and died in Grindelwald, Canton of Bern.

Climbing career
Almer gave his dog Tschingel to the 17-year-old W. A. B. Coolidge after a failed attempt on the Eiger.

Golden wedding anniversary
On June 20 and 21, 1896, Almer and his wife Margaritha ("Gritli") celebrated their golden (50th) wedding anniversary by climbing the Wetterhorn: "The oldest of the Grindelwald guides, Christian Almer, well known to Alpine climbers, celebrated his golden wedding on Sunday in a novel way. Christian is seventy-four years of age, and his wife seventy-five. Accompanied by two of their younger sons and by the village doctor, the sturdy old couple made the ascent of the Wetterhorn, 12,150 ft high. Starting at a very early hour on Sunday morning, they reached the Wetterhorn Hut in the evening, their safe arrival there being made known to their fellow villagers by a signal light, which, shone in response to the many rockets fired by the sympathetic villagers below. Here the veteran climbers and their companions passed the night, and starting soon after midnight for the remainder of the ascent, they reached the summit at half-past six on Monday morning. A cloudless sky and magnificent panorama of the Oberland rewarded their courage and endurance. The aged couple returned safely to Grindelwald on Monday evening."

First ascents
1857 Mönch (Bernese Alps)
1858 Eiger (Bernese Alps)
1862 Gross Fiescherhorn (Bernese Alps)
1864 Barre des Ecrins (Dauphiné Alps)
1865 Aiguille Verte (Mont Blanc Massif)
1865 Grand Cornier (Pennine Alps)
1865 Pointe Whymper on the Grandes Jorasses (Mont Blanc Massif)
1865 Nesthorn (Bernese Alps)
1867 Kleines Schreckhorn (Bernese Alps)
1870 Ailefroide (Dauphiné Alps)
1874 Mont Thuria, (Graian Alps)
1876 Les Droites west summit (Mont Blanc Massif) 
1877 Pic Coolidge (Dauphiné Alps)
1878 Aiguille Arves Méridonale (Dauphiné Alps)
1878 Aiguille de l'Epaisseur (Dauphiné Alps)
1878 Les Bans (Dauphiné Alps)
1879 Aiguille de Chambeyron (Cottian Alps)
1881 Visolotto (Cottian Alps)
1884 Pointe de Soliette (Graian Alps)

Death and Grave
Christian Almer died in Grindelwald on 17 May 1898. His gravestone reads:

Hier ruht der besten Führer einer
CHRISTIAN ALMER
geb. 29. März 1826. gest. 17. Mai  1898

Galt’s Berge zu bezwingen,/ 
Gab’s keinen bessern Mann;/
Wer mit dir stritt und siegte,/
Dich nie vergessen kann./
Jetzt darfst du auf den Zinnen/
Der ewige Berge stehn./
Wohin dich Christus führte./
Dort Freund auf Wiedersehn/
Deine alten treuen Fahrgenossen.

[Here rests one of the best guides
CHRISTIAN ALMER
born March 29, 1826, died May 17, 1898.

Were mountains to be conquered,/
There wasn't a better man;/
Whoever struggled with you and won,/
Can never forget you./
Now you may stand on the summits/
Of the eternal mountains./
Where Christ led you./
There friend goodbye./
Your old, loyal companions.]

References

1826 births
1898 deaths
People from Interlaken-Oberhasli District
Alpine guides
Swiss mountain climbers
People from Grindelwald